Ronali Amatya (18 December 1995) is a Nepali model and beauty pageant title holder who won "Miss Nepal International 2018".

Early life and education 
Amatya was involved with sports as a child, including karate.

She graduated with her bachelor's degree at age 20.

Career

Modeling 
Amatya began her modeling career after winning Model Hunt Nepal 2016, organized by The Next Models Nepal. During the competition she won the title of "Miss Personality". 

Amatya modeled at a graduation fashion show at Namuna College of Fashion Technology in 2016 and in The Mount Everest Fashion Runway in January 2020.

Pageantry 
Amatya won Miss Eco International Nepal 2017. At Miss Eco International 2017 in Egypt, she received the title of "Miss Congeniality".

She represented Nepal in "Miss International 2018" held in Tokyo Dome City Hall in Tokyo, Japan. She would again represent Nepal at Miss Grand International 2021 in Thailand.

Personal life 
Amatya struggled with self-image issues (and subsequent mental health issues) after entering the modeling and pageant industries. She began addressing these issues in 2020 during the quarantine imposed by the COVID-19 pandemic. She has also dealt with gastritis. 

She took up yoga in 2017.

References 

()

1996 births
Living people
Miss Nepal winners
Nepalese beauty pageant winners
Miss International 2018 delegates